Lemma is an album composed by John Zorn and featuring violinists David Fulmer, Chris Otto and Pauline Kim which as recorded in New York City in 2012 and released on the Tzadik label in February 2013.

Reception

Martin Schray stated "Although John Zorn has been widely acclaimed for his music, his compositions in the field of new classical music deserve more attention".

Track listing
All compositions by John Zorn
 "Apophthegms First Set I" – 0:45
 "Apophthegms First Set II" – 1:07
 "Apophthegms First Set III" – 1:44
 "Apophthegms First Set IV" – 1:23
 "Apophthegms First Set V" – 1:44
 "Apophthegms First Set VI" – 1:50
 "Apophthegms Second Set VII" – 2:41
 "Apophthegms Second Set VIII" – 1:49
 "Apophthegms Second Set IX" – 2:05
 "Apophthegms Second Set X" – 1:20
 "Apophthegms Second Set XI" – 1:55
 "Apophthegms Second Set XII" – 2:47
 "Passagen" – 14:19  
 "Ceremonial Music I" – 5:27
 "Ceremonial Music II" – 4:05
 "Ceremonial Music III" – 5:51
 "Ceremonial Music IV" – 3:49

Personnel
 Chris Otto (tracks 1–12), David Fulmer (tracks 1–12 & 14–17), Pauline Kim (track 13) – violin

Production
Marc Urselli – engineer, audio mixer
John Zorn and Kazunori Sugiyama – producers

See also
Zorn's lemma

References
 

2013 albums
John Zorn albums
Albums produced by John Zorn
Tzadik Records albums